The Frasin-Gura Humorului gas field is a natural gas field located in Gura Humorului, Suceava County. It was discovered in 1971 and developed by Romgaz. It began production in 1972 and produces natural gas and condensates. The total proven reserves of the Frasin-Gura Humorului gas field are around 36 billion cubic feet (1 km³), and production is slated to be around 4.9 million cubic feet/day (0.14×105m³) in 2010.

References

Natural gas fields in Romania